Theddy Ladislaus is the youngest delegate of the first Constituent Assembly of Tanzania, representing students and youth in the constitution making process. She was appointed by His Excellency Dr. Jakaya Mrisho Kikwete, the former President of the United Republic of Tanzania.

Early life 
Theddy Ladislaus was born in the United Republic of Tanzania. She served as the vice president of the Mzumbe University Student Organisation-MUSO from 2013 to 2014. She was elected and later appointed as a delegate in the constituent assembly of Tanzania.

Education 
Ms Ladislaus pursued her degree in BSc information communication technology with business and later she did her master's degree in international business and entrepreneurship.

References 

Living people
1992 births
Mzumbe University alumni
Tanzanian politicians